Ceredo may refer to:
Ceredo, Kentucky, a community in Ballard County, Kentucky
Ceredo, West Virginia, a city in Wayne County, West Virginia